TAA stands for Trans Australia Airlines, now part of Qantas.

TAA or Taa may also refer to:

Biology and medicine
Tumor associated antigen
Trimeric Autotransporter Adhesins, in biology, a gram-negative outer membrane virulence factor
Tachyarrhythmia absoluta, a form of cardiac arrhythmia
TAA, a stop codon in molecular biology
Thoracic aortic aneurysm

Organizations
Tanganyika African Association
Tanzania Airports Authority
Teaching Assistants Association, a graduate student union at University of Wisconsin–Madison
Tourette Association of America (formerly Tourette Syndrome Association)

Other uses
Taa, a Khoisan language of southern Africa 
Ṭāʼ or Teth, a letter of the Arabic abjad
Tactical asset allocation, an investment strategy 
The Amity Affliction, an Australian post-hardcore band
Trade Adjustment Assistance, a US program to help workers displaced by trade
Trade Agreements Act of 1979, a United States statute
Trent Alexander-Arnold (born 1998), English professional footballer
Tribes: Aerial Assault, an online video game for PlayStation 2
Taa, the fictional home world of the Marvel Comics character Galactus
Temporal anti-aliasing, a computer graphics algorithm
tert-Amyl alcohol, a colorless liquid
TSX (or Transactional) Asynchronous Abort, a type of transient execution CPU vulnerability

See also 
 TAAS (disambiguation)